Broke is an American comedy streaming television series produced exclusively for YouTube Red, starring Quinta Brunson. The series premiered on January 26, 2017. The first season, which had 11 episodes, ended on March 23, 2017. The series was produced by BuzzFeed Motion Pictures, the second YouTube Red digital original series from the company after Squad Wars.

The series is about three friends (also featuring Maurice Williams and Paul DuPree) move from Philadelphia to Los Angeles.

Cast 
Quinta Brunson as Miloh
Maurice Williams as Maurice
Paul DuPree as Paul

Episodes

References 

American comedy web series
2010s YouTube series
YouTube Premium original series
English-language television shows
2010s American comedy television series
2017 web series debuts
2017 web series endings